Pigment yellow 185 is an organic compound that is used as a green yellow pigment and optical brightener.  It is classified as a derivative of isoindoline. This yellow green  compound is prepared by addition of ammonia to o-phthalonitrile to give the diiminoisoindoline, which in turn condenses first with N-methylcyanoacetamide and then with barbituric acid.

References

Pigments
Organic pigments
Shades of green